The Arboretum of South Barrington is a shopping center in South Barrington, Illinois, a suburb of Chicago, Illinois, United States. The center is looking to attract retailers. The  center comprises a mix of apparel and furniture retailers, restaurants, and a movie theater.

Sale
On December 15, 2010, owner Jaffe Cos. announced they were putting the mall up for sale as they were unable to pay off the $91,000,000 construction loan. In 2011, Jaffe Cos. brought in a partner, Long Warf, to pay off the debt. It sold the mall to Starwood Retail Properties.

Stores
Currently, there are 48 committed retailers and restaurants. Among them are Gold Class Cinemas, L.L.Bean, and Midwest Elite Gymnastics Academy.

References

External links
 

Shopping malls in Cook County, Illinois
Shopping malls established in 2008
2008 establishments in Illinois